Massimo Cavaliere (born 21 November 1962) is an Italian fencer. He won a bronze medal in the team sabre event at the 1988 Summer Olympics.

References

External links
 

1962 births
Living people
Italian male fencers
Olympic fencers of Italy
Fencers at the 1988 Summer Olympics
Olympic bronze medalists for Italy
Olympic medalists in fencing
Fencers from Naples
Medalists at the 1988 Summer Olympics